Guitar Hero: Warriors of Rock is the sixth main game in the Guitar Hero series, released by Activision to the Xbox 360, PlayStation 3, and Wii consoles in September 2010. The game was developed by Activision's subsidiary studios RedOctane, Neversoft, and Vicarious Visions; the latter provided support for additional features in the Wii version of the game. Following a decline in sales of music games in 2009, partially due to the large number of music games released that year, Activision scaled back their efforts in the Guitar Hero series. Warriors of Rock represents the final game developed by RedOctane and Neversoft. Both studios' respective Guitar Hero divisions were closed once the game was complete, with key personnel brought into Activision directly for future games. It was initially announced that Vicarious Visions would take over future game development of the Guitar Hero series, however due to declining music game sales, all further development of the Guitar Hero series was cancelled, until 2015 when Guitar Hero Live was released.

As with previous games in the series, Warriors of Rock challenges one to four local or online players to use special instrument controllers based on guitar, bass, drums, and vocals to simulate the playing of rock music, matching notes as they scroll on-screen with specific actions of the controller to score points and successfully complete songs that are available on-disc, through imports of other Guitar Hero games, or purchasable as downloadable content. Players are awarded star ratings based on their performance; in Warriors of Rock, the typical limit of five stars can easily be surpassed through gameplay-changing powers possessed by the eight in-game characters when they are used. Players can opt to play songs on one of six difficulty levels, from Beginner to Expert (Expert+ on drums), that alter the number of notes and scrolling speed.

Main setlist
There are 93 songs by 85 artists on-disc for Warriors of Rock. Recent games in the Guitar Hero series were found to have soundtracks that attempted to please several types of players, leading to dilution of the experience; Warriors of Rock was designed to follow the success of Guitar Hero III: Legends of Rock with a soundtrack that was more focused on the rock 'n roll genre, according to project director Brian Bright. The game features songs primarily from the punk, alternative, and classic rock genres, and with heavy focus on lead guitar portions as this was found to be the most popular instrument to players. The game's on-disc setlist is also claimed to be more difficult than previous games, as Activision found most players would quickly progress to the highest difficulty, Expert, shortly after each game's release. Bright noted that "there's still range and still a lot of variety in this game" to avoid too much alienating of long-time fans of the series in general.

Warriors of Rocks primary gameplay mode is "Quest Mode", a story-driven campaign in which players recruit eight fictional characters to help rescue the Demigod of Rock from imprisonment by The Beast; the story is narrated by Gene Simmons. For each character, the player must earn a number of stars on a selection of songs tied to each character that represented the genre the character personifies; for example, the mohawk-wearing Johnny Napalm has songs primarily from the punk genre. After achieving the required number of stars, the character transforms into a more powerful character, and the player must complete one more song (the "encore") to recruit the character. That character will then join in the fight against the Beast, and the opportunity to recruit other characters become available. One highlight of Quest Mode's story involves finding the Demigod's guitar in a cave; this part of the story is set to match the lyrics of Rush's 7-part epic, "2112", with Rush members Geddy Lee, Neil Peart, and Alex Lifeson narrating the story. Outside Quest Mode, on-disc songs can be played at any time in "Quickplay+ Mode", an expanded version of previous games' Quickplay modes featuring more challenges, and various competitive and cooperative multiplayer modes. The parts of "2112" and many of the songs in the last part of the Quest progress are only available after being completed in Quest Mode.

All songs in Guitar Hero: Warriors of Rock are master recordings. Two songs, Alice Cooper's "No More Mr. Nice Guy" and The Runaways' "Cherry Bomb", were specifically re-recorded by the original performers for use in Warriors of Rock. The song "Black Rain" by Soundgarden represents the first single by the group since 1997, and the release of the game was planned in coordination with Soundgarden's Telephantasm compilation album that includes the single.  Megadeth's "Sudden Death" was specifically written by Dave Mustaine as the final song within Warriors of Rocks setlist; its polyrhythms and difficult passes make it one of the toughest songs to beat.

Reviewers found the soundtrack to lack the focus that Activision claims it has, and that the series may have exhausted a number of good guitar songs in its previous iterations. Arthur Gies of IGN stated that the game soundtrack "may be the most uneven collection in any of the main Guitar Hero titles", citing problems with "a surplus of tracks that seem out of place", "too many songs that are just boring to play", and "a number of synth heavy songs that are nevertheless shoehorned" into the game. Official Xbox Magazine UK stated that the setlist "feels at times uninspired, incongruous and uninteresting". Game Informers Matt Helgeson felt that the setlist was "a mixed bag", with a strong and balanced set of songs in the early tiers of Quest Mode, while the latter, more difficult songs were "terrible and felt like a chore" to complete. Roger Hargreaves of Metro commented that "with so many of the more iconic rock songs having already been used in previous Guitar Hero and Rock Band games developers are forced to use ever more obscure songs and/or acts". On the other hand, USA Todays Mike Snider claimed that the game's soundtrack "gave [him] a reason to blast music on [his] stereo", and besides providing well-known songs and bands, introduced him to new bands.

The on-disc songs are presented in the following table by their year of recording, song name and artist, their genre as defined in-game, and the set or tier within the Quest Mode where they appear.

 Song contains Expert+ parts (double bass drum and ghost notes) for drums.
 Song has been re-recorded for the game.
 Song does not have parts for one or more instruments.

Importable content

Warriors of Rock allows for importing a majority of songs from four previous Guitar Hero games into the game's Quickplay+ and other competitive modes; the import requires a one-time fee and includes necessary updates to previous songs to match new formats within Warriors of Rock.  Just prior to Warriors of Rocks release, it was announced that thirty-nine songs from Guitar Hero: Metallica would also be importable into the game, with the import fee waived during the first week of release.

Downloadable content
Warriors of Rock provides the capacity to purchase more songs that can be played in the game alongside the on-disc soundtrack through downloadable content for each console. All previous downloadable content that worked with Guitar Hero 5 can be played within Warriors of Rock. Following Activision's February 2011 decision to shutter their Guitar Hero development, no further downloadable content will be forthcoming for the title.  Due to "continued support" from their fanbase, Activision continued to release downloadable content for the game through March and April 2011 with packs that were in the works prior to this.

Initial shipments of the game in the United States are also bundled with Soundgarden's latest album, Telephantasm, which includes the new track "Black Rain" and other previous Soundgarden songs; "Black Rain" is available on the Warriors of Rock disc to play, while the remaining eleven tracks on the album, songs from previous Soundgarden albums, were available as downloadable content alongside release of the game. Due to this bundling, Telephantasm became the first album to achieve "platinum" status from the Recording Industry Association of America for shipping over 1 million non-refunded albums due to the tie-in with a video-game product.

References

External links
 Official website

Warriors of Rock